Meyers Patrick Leonard (born February 27, 1992) is an American professional basketball player for the Milwaukee Bucks of the National Basketball Association (NBA). He played college basketball for the University of Illinois Fighting Illini before being selected by the Portland Trail Blazers with the 11th overall pick in the 2012 NBA draft. After spending his first seven seasons with the Trail Blazers, he was traded to the Miami Heat in the 2019 off-season. He reached the NBA Finals with the Heat in 2020.

Early life
Leonard, born in Woodbridge, Virginia, grew up in Robinson, Illinois, a small town in southeastern Illinois. When he was six years old, his father James, a golf pro, was killed in a freak bicycle accident. His mother Tracie, once an athlete who would run upwards of 10 miles a day, had been largely housebound since her husband's death, due to an old horseback injury and subsequent disc surgery that left her with crippling pain.

When he was in second grade, the young Leonard gained a surrogate family. Brian Siler, an insurance agent in Robinson who had a son of the same age, was aware of Leonard's family situation, and eventually became a father figure. Leonard regularly attended the Silers' church and went on family vacations. According to ESPN.com writer Dana O'Neil:
"Looking to shoehorn the relationship into a convenient box, outsiders have called this Meyers' version of The Blind Side, but the comparison is inaccurate. The book and subsequent movie tell the story of Michael Oher, a boy who was homeless and didn't have much of a family life. Meyers Leonard has a family. It has not abandoned him. On the contrary, Tracie loves her son, loves him so much that she was willing to accept help."

High school career
Leonard entered high school as a guard, but was converted to center after a six-inch (15 cm) growth spurt between his freshman and sophomore years. O'Neil called him "something of a basketball anomaly", adding that Leonard "gained all that height without losing his coordination or his fast-twitch muscles."

In high school, Leonard was named a member of the 2010 Illinois All-State Team as selected by the Associated Press, Chicago Tribune, Chicago Sun-Times, News-Gazette, and the Illinois Basketball Coaches Association. Leonard led Robinson High School to the IHSA class 2A state championship before choosing to play collegiate basketball at the University of Illinois.

College career

Illinois (2010–2012)

As a freshman at the University of Illinois at Urbana–Champaign  in 2010–11, Leonard averaged 2.1 points and 1.2 rebounds per game in 8.2 minutes per game for the Fighting Illini. Following the season he was invited to the June 17–24, 2011, 17-man tryouts for the 12-man FIBA Under-19 World Championship team by USA Basketball. Leonard was one of 12 selected players that competed as Team USA in the 2011 FIBA U19 World Championships in Latvia from June 30 – July 10, 2011, and placed fifth in the competition.

As a sophomore in 2011–12, Leonard averaged 13.6 points and 8.2 rebounds per game. Leonard was named Big Ten Co-Player of the Week on December 5, 2011 after averaging 16.5 points and 6.0 rebounds per game in two Illinois victories. Leonard was also named Big Ten Player of the Week on December 26, 2011 after averaging 16.5 points and 14.5 rebounds per game in two games. Following the season, Leonard was named Honorable Mention All Big-10. He then entered the NBA draft.

Professional career

Portland Trail Blazers (2012–2019)
Leonard was drafted with the 11th overall pick by the Portland Trail Blazers in the 2012 NBA draft. On July 13 he signed his rookie scale contract with the Trail Blazers. On October 31, 2012, Leonard made his NBA debut, logging 23 minutes and scoring four points against the Los Angeles Lakers. He made his first career start on November 21, 2012, against the Phoenix Suns, finishing with 12 points and 5 rebounds. On March 30, 2013, he had a season-best game with 22 points and 10 rebounds in a loss to the Golden State Warriors.

Leonard's numbers dipped from his rookie to sophomore season, falling behind fellow second-year big man Joel Freeland as the primary backup to starter Robin Lopez. He saw action in 29 fewer games in 2013–14, with his minutes and points per game cut in half, as the Blazers transformed from a lottery team to a playoff contender. On January 2, 2014, he had a season-best game with 8 points and 10 rebounds in a 134–104 win over the Charlotte Bobcats.

In 2014–15, Leonard played only 13 total minutes in Portland's first 9 games as he was stuck in the big man rotation behind Lopez, Freeland and Chris Kaman. On November 15, 2014, with LaMarcus Aldridge scratched with an upper respiratory illness against the Brooklyn Nets, Leonard picked up the start at power forward, playing 29 minutes. With his first major minutes at the power forward spot, he performed admirably, tallying 12 rebounds and hitting a three-pointer. He went on to pick up DNPs in 11 of the next 12 games. But when Lopez broke his hand going up for a rebound against the San Antonio Spurs on December 15, Leonard got another chance to show that he deserved time on the court. His improvement was incremental, but noticeable, over the following seven weeks. His play while Lopez was out earned him time to prove himself. He only saw six DNPs after the turn of the year, and grew in confidence despite limited minutes. At the season's end, Leonard had produced a remarkable Steve Nash-like 50/40/90 season, shooting 51% from the field, 42% from three-point range, and 93% from the free throw line. In the penultimate game of the regular season on April 13, he scored a career-high 24 points in a loss to the Oklahoma City Thunder. He went on to record a playoff-best game with 13 points and 13 rebounds in a win over the Memphis Grizzlies in Game 4 of Portland's first-round series. The Blazers lost the series 4–1.

On December 1, 2015, Leonard scored a season-high 23 points in a loss to the Dallas Mavericks. On March 24, 2016, he was ruled out for the rest of the season after injuring his left shoulder, requiring surgery.

On July 10, 2016, Leonard re-signed with the Trail Blazers on a four-year, $41 million contract. On October 8, 2016, he was cleared for all practice activities, six months after undergoing surgery on his left shoulder. On December 23, 2016, he scored a season-high 16 points off the bench in a 110–90 loss to the Spurs.

On May 20, 2019, in Game 4 of the Western Conference Finals, Leonard recorded a career-high 30 points and 12 rebounds in a 119–117 overtime loss to the Golden State Warriors.

Miami Heat (2019–2021)
On July 6, 2019, Leonard was traded to the Miami Heat in a four-team trade. The Heat reached the 2020 NBA Finals, but lost the series in 6 games to the Los Angeles Lakers. Leonard started two games in the Finals when Bam Adebayo was injured.

On November 22, 2020, the Miami Heat announced that they had re-signed with Leonard. On February 2, 2021, it was reported that Leonard had undergone shoulder surgery and would miss the remainder of 2020–21 season.

On March 9, 2021, the Heat announced that Leonard would be suspended indefinitely while the NBA conducted an investigation into his use of an anti-Semitic slur during a Twitch video game livestream session. The NBA suspended him for one week and fined him $50,000.

On March 17, 2021, Leonard was traded to the Oklahoma City Thunder with a 2027 second round pick for Trevor Ariza. The Thunder stated that Leonard would not be joining the team or participating in any basketball activities and that they had traded for him as a salary filler. Leonard was released on March 25.

In April 2021, he underwent an ankle surgery. Leonard was soon found to have nerve damage within the bottom half of his right leg.

On January 13, 2023, the Los Angeles Lakers hosted Leonard for a workout, which was the first publicized activity of his attempted NBA comeback after his anti-Semitism controversy.

Milwaukee Bucks (2023–present)
On February 22, 2023, Leonard signed a 10-day contract with the Milwaukee Bucks. On March 4, he signed a second 10-day contract with the Bucks. On March 14, he signed a contract to stay on the team for the rest of the season.

Career statistics

NBA

Regular season

|-
| 
| style="text-align:left;"|Portland
| 69 || 9 || 17.5 || .545 || .429 || .809 || 3.7 || .5 || .2 || .6 || 5.5
|-
| style="text-align:left;"|
| style="text-align:left;"|Portland
| 40 || 0 || 8.9 || .451 || .000 || .762 || 2.8 || .5 || .2 || .1 || 2.5
|-
| style="text-align:left;"|
| style="text-align:left;"|Portland
| 55 || 7 || 15.4 || .510 || .420 || .938 || 4.5 || .6 || .2 || .3 || 5.9
|-
| style="text-align:left;"|
| style="text-align:left;"|Portland
| 61 || 10 || 21.9 || .448 || .377 || .761 || 5.1 || 1.5 || .1 || .3 || 8.4
|-
| style="text-align:left;"|
| style="text-align:left;"|Portland
| 74 || 12 || 16.5 || .386 || .347 || .875 || 3.2 || 1.0 || .2 || .4 || 5.4
|-
| style="text-align:left;"|
| style="text-align:left;"|Portland
| 33 || 2 || 7.7 || .590 || .423 || .818 || 2.1 || .5 || .2 || .0 || 3.4
|-
| style="text-align:left;"|
| style="text-align:left;"|Portland
| 61 || 2 || 14.4 || .545 || .450 || .843 || 3.8 || 1.2 || .2 || .1 || 5.9
|-
| style="text-align:left;"|
| style="text-align:left;"|Miami
| 51 || 49 || 20.3 || .509 || .414 || .643 || 5.1 || 1.1 || .3 || .3 || 6.1
|-
| style="text-align:left;"|
| style="text-align:left;"|Miami
| 3 || 2 || 9.7 || .429 || .429 || .500 || 2.3 || .7 || .0 || .0 || 3.3
|- class="sortbottom"
| style="text-align:center;" colspan="2"|Career
| 447 || 93 || 16.0 || .482 || .390 || .809 || 3.9 || .9 || .2 || .3 || 5.6

Playoffs

|-
| style="text-align:left;"|2014
| style="text-align:left;"|Portland
| 4 || 0 || 2.3 || .000 ||  ||  || .5 || .0 || .0 || .0 || .0
|-
| style="text-align:left;"|2015
| style="text-align:left;"|Portland
| 5 || 0 || 21.2 || .667 || .769 || .500 || 6.6 || 1.0 || .4 || .4 || 7.8
|-
| style="text-align:left;"|2017
| style="text-align:left;"|Portland
| 3 || 1 || 10.3 || .200 || .000 ||  || 2.7 || .3 || .0 || .0 || .7
|-
| style="text-align:left;"|2018
| style="text-align:left;"|Portland
| 2 || 0 || 4.0 || 1.000 ||  ||  || 2.0 || .0 || .0 || .0 || 4.0
|-
| style="text-align:left;"|2019
| style="text-align:left;"|Portland
| 11 || 2 || 15.5 || .523 || .424 || .333 || 3.6 || 1.1 || .2 || .1 || 7.7
|-
| style="text-align:left;"|2020
| style="text-align:left;"|Miami
| 3 || 2 || 10.3 || .625 || .500 || 1.000 || .3 || 1.0 || .3 || .0 || 4.7 
|- class="sortbottom"
| style="text-align:center;" colspan="2"|Career
| 28 || 5 || 12.7 || .552 || .481 || .462 || 3.1 || .8 || .2 || .1 || 5.3

College

|-
| style="text-align:left;"|2010–11
| style="text-align:left;"|Illinois
| 33 || 1 || 8.2 || .483 || .000 || .706 || 1.2 || .2 || .2 || .4 || 2.1
|-
| style="text-align:left;"|2011–12
| style="text-align:left;"|Illinois
| 32 || 29 || 31.8 || .584 || .091 || .732 || 8.2 || 1.3 || .5 || 1.9 || 13.6
|- class="sortbottom"
| style="text-align:center;" colspan="2"|Career
| 65 || 30 || 19.8 || .567 || .083 || .729 || 4.7 || .7 || .3 || 1.1 || 7.7

Personal life
Leonard has two older brothers; Christian Juracich, who died in 2020 and Bailey Leonard, a former U.S. Marine who has served in Afghanistan. In August 2015, Leonard married his long-time girlfriend. They founded a sports bar company called Level Foods together. The couple has one son.

In April 2019, Leonard invested in FaZe Clan as a content creator.

Controversy
On March 9, 2021, Leonard received criticism for using the anti-jewish slur "kike" during a Twitch stream while playing Call of Duty: Warzone. The Heat announced the same day that they were reviewing the matter and that Leonard would be "away from the team indefinitely." The eSports organization FaZe Clan cut ties with him later that day, although he remained an investor. He later apologized for using the slur, stating that he did not know what it meant.

References

External links

1992 births
Living people
American men's basketball players
Basketball players from Illinois
Centers (basketball)
FaZe Clan players
Illinois Fighting Illini men's basketball players
Miami Heat players
Milwaukee Bucks players
People from Robinson, Illinois
Portland Trail Blazers draft picks
Portland Trail Blazers players
Power forwards (basketball)
Twitch (service) streamers